Aziz Mukhamedovich Sydykov (Russian: Азиз Мухамедович Сыдыков; born 23 June 1992) is a Kyrgyzstani footballer who plays for Dordoi Bishkek as a midfielder. He is a member of the Kyrgyzstan national football team.

Career

Club
On 31 January 2019, Dordoi Bishkek announced that Sydykov had left the club to join Sanat Naft Abadan on loan until the end of the 2018–19 Persian Gulf Pro League season.

International
Sydykov is a member of the Kyrgyzstan national football team.

Career statistics

International

Statistics accurate as of match played 8 October 2015

International Goals

References

External links
Team announcement at uff.uz 

1992 births
Living people
Kyrgyzstan international footballers
Footballers at the 2010 Asian Games
Kyrgyzstani footballers
Footballers at the 2014 Asian Games
Association football midfielders
FC Alga Bishkek players
FC Abdysh-Ata Kant players
FC Dordoi Bishkek players
Sanat Naft Abadan F.C. players
2019 AFC Asian Cup players
Asian Games competitors for Kyrgyzstan